Vibhavari Apte Joshi is an Indian singer in Bollywood, and in Marathi and Tamil language films.

Career
She hails from Pune in Maharashtra state of India. She has sung in many Marathi movies, Bollywood movies such as Guzaarish and many other musical albums. Awards won by her include Vidya Pradnya Award from Maharashtra Government in 2013, Stardust New Musical Sensation Award in 2011 and Jio-Mirchi award for Best Female Vocalist in 2016. She is a post graduate in commerce.

She has made performances along with Isaignani Ilaiyaraaja, Hrishikesh Ranade, Jitendra Abhyankar, Ketaki Mategaonkar, Suvarna Mategaonkar, Prashant Naseri, Madhura Datar etc. She has also performed the TV programs like Saregama. She is also a part of the musical program by Hridaynath Mangeshkar named Bhavsargam.

Popular songs
 "Natyas naav apulya" : Marathi movie: Natasamrat.
 Saiba
 Ugavali Chandrakor
 Tu Buddhi de (Marathi movie: Dr. Prakash Baba Amte)
 Vidnyanroop Ganesh
 Disha Dishatun Chaitanyache 
 Kamba Suthi (with S. P Balasubramaniam in Muthuramalingam)
 Sutti Penne in Touring Talkies
 Pournami Poove in Rudhramadevi(Tamil)
 Eearamai Earamai in Un Samayal Araiyil
 Galiya Mathali in Oggarane
 Swapnat Aaj Yeta Sur Taal Chedale Re

Accolades

References

External links
 https://www.youtube.com/watch?v=K7FvLalkp2M
 https://www.youtube.com/watch?v=1XU7P8-BklM

Living people
Indian women playback singers
Tamil playback singers
Marathi playback singers
Singers from Pune
Date of birth missing (living people)
Women musicians from Maharashtra
21st-century Indian singers
21st-century Indian women singers
Bollywood playback singers
Year of birth missing (living people)